The 2019 Euro Tour Season was a professional pool series of events on the Euro Tour held in 2019. The season featured six tournament for both men and five for women, with the first being the Leende Open and the last being the Antalya Open.

Calendar

Rankings
Rankings for the events featured points awarded for players final positions in events with the following scores:

Men's
Below is a list of the 50 players in terms of ranking points for the 2019 season. Rankings for the Euro Tour consist of the last seven tournaments, so the final event of 2018 – the 2018 Treviso Open is included. Joshua Filler finished the season as the number one rated player, finishing as a quarter-finalist or better in five of the six events.

Women's

References

External links

Euro Tour
2019 in cue sports